Perry Pruett (born March 7, 1949) is a former American football defensive back. He played for the New England Patriots in 1971.

References

1949 births
Living people
American football defensive backs
North Texas Mean Green football players
New England Patriots players